The mayor of Bandung is an elected politician who is responsible of governing the city of Bandung. The first mayor of Bandung was E.A. Maurenbrecher, who governed the city during the Dutch colonisation period from 1906–1907. Since then, Bandung has been governed by 29 mayors and 6 vice mayors.

List of mayors of Bandung

Dutch colonisation period
 E.A. Maurenbrecher (1906–1907)
 R.E. Krijboom (1907–1908)
 J.A. van Der Ent (1909–1910)
 J.J. Verwijk (1910–1912)
 C.C.B van Vlenier (1912–1913)
 B. van Bijveld (1913–1920)
 Bertus Coops (1920–1921)
 Steve Anne Reitsma (1921–1928)
 Bertus Coops (2nd term) (1928–1934)
 J.E.A. van Wolzogen Kuhr (1934–1936)
 J.M. Wesselink (1936–1942)

Japanese occupation period
 N. Beets (1942–1945)

Post-independence period

References

Bandung
Mayors of Bandung